

Goose Island Aquatic Reserve is a marine protected area in the Australian state of South Australia located in waters adjoining the following island located in Spencer Gulf immediately north of Wardang Island and west of the town of Port Victoria - Goose Island, Little Goose Island and White Rock Island. 

It was declared on 30 November 1971 to provide “a conservation area where teaching institutions may conduct classes and scientific research on marine biology and ecology and to protect the habitat of the seal colony situated on White Rocks.”  Activities such as fishing and the collection or removal of any marine organism is prohibited, while the following activities are permitted - use of boats, swimming, snorkelling and scuba diving.

Since 2012, it has been located within the boundaries of a “sanctuary zone” within the Eastern Spencer Gulf Marine Park.

The aquatic reserve is classified as an IUCN Category II protected area.

See also
Protected areas of South Australia
Goose Island (disambiguation)

References

External links
Webpage for Goose Island Aquatic Reserve on the Protected Planet website

Aquatic reserves of South Australia
Protected areas established in 1971  
1971 establishments in Australia
Spencer Gulf